Macarköy is a village in Gazipaşa province of Antalya, Turkey.

Villages in Gazipaşa District